Qeshm International Airport  is an international airport near the village of Dayrestan, roughly in the centre of Qeshm Island, off the south coast of Iran.

Facilities 

Dr Allan Wain, economics and policy advisor, stated that the overall site area available for expansion of airport uses measures approximately 2,032 ha., although only a very small area on the northwest side of the property is used for aviation activities. Dr Wain further indicated that most of the airport facilities that currently exist were constructed in 1996 and 1997, and the airport opened to commercial air traffic in July 1997. The fuel farm and ATC tower were constructed in 2002/3.

The airport is served by commercial air services that link Qeshm Island to the United Arab Emirates and to Tehran.

Dr Wain said that passenger traffic amounts to some 206,570 passengers (2004 figure), which is an overall increase of 30 per cent in passenger volumes since 2002. All of this increase is in the international sector, as there has been a slight decline (2.6%) in domestic passengers in this time. 73% of passenger traffic is international, although approximately half of that is "visa traffic" on quick turnaround flights, which are generated in response to the visa regulations for migrant workers in the UAE states.

A small amount of cargo traffic is handled by the airport, but this is limited in extent and handled informally through the passenger terminal, as no facilities exist to accommodate air cargo operations.

Airlines and destinations

References

Airports in Iran
Qeshm County
Buildings and structures in Hormozgan Province
Transportation in Hormozgan Province